Double Trouble is a 1984 Italian comedy film directed by Enzo Barboni (as E.B. Clucher) and starring the comedy team of Terence Hill and Bud Spencer.

Plot
Portuguese Brazilian billionaire cousins Bastiano and Antonio Coimbra de la Coronilla y Azevedo are in fear for their lives after several assassination attempts. Therefore, they have an agency find two look-alikes, stuntman Elliot Vance and the saxophone-playing small-time criminal Greg Wonder, to temporarily take their place and find out who is behind the assassination attempts.
Elliot and Greg manage to fight their way through all kinds of situations without too much trouble while getting closer to the mastermind behind it all. Additionally they quickly come to like the jet-set life. The resulting damage to their reputation provokes the Coimbras to return to Rio ahead of time. This puts them right into the sights of their enemies, alongside the cousins' look-alikes.

Cast
 Terence Hill as Elliot Vance / Bastiano Joao Coimbra de la Coronilla y Azevedo
 Bud Spencer as Greg Wonder / Antonio Coimbra de la Coronilla y Azevedo
 April Clough as Olympia Chavez
 Nello Pazzafini as Tango
 Harold Bergman
 C.V. Wood Jr.
 Dary Reiz
 Franco Sattamini as Tango's Thug

References

External links

1984 films
English-language Italian films
Terence Hill and Bud Spencer
Films set in Rio de Janeiro (city)
Films shot in Rio de Janeiro (city)
Films shot in São Paulo (state)
Films scored by Franco Micalizzi
Italian comedy films
1980s action comedy films
1984 comedy films
Films set in New Orleans
1980s English-language films
1980s Italian films